Selangau, Sarawak, (Malay: Pekan Selangau) is a small town located by the Pan Borneo Highway (Sibu-Bintulu Road). It is also located by Batang Mukah, a river which flows to the South China Sea. Selangau town is the administrative centre for the Selangau District.

Etymology
The name "Selangau" comes from the name of a river, which is one of the tributaries of the Mukah river.

History
The earliest settlement of Selangau town was near the Selangau river delta (near Nanga Selangau primary school today). Initially, the area was inhabited by the Beketan people before they were displaced by the Iban people from Kanowit and Lemanak river. The Beketan people then moved to Tatau District. Meanwhile, the Iban people inhabited the Selangau delta in the 1930s and 1940s. There were only four shophouses owned by Chinese and Iban people selling groceries at that time.

In the 1960s, after the completion of Pan Borneo Highway between Sibu and Bintulu, these residents then moved their homes to the present location beside the highway. Selangau was originally put under the administration of Mukah district. However, with the increasing number of traders coming to town, has raised the population of the town. In the 1970s, a representative was chosen to administer the town and act as an intermediary between the government and the people. Selangau also become a resting station for the people who ply the highway regularly.

In the 1980s, a great fire burnt down the wooden houses in the town of Selangau. After that concrete houses were built to replace the wooden houses.

Due to the rising population and the development of Selangau, it was declared as a new district on 1 March 2002 with the Selangau town acted as the administrative centre. The Selangau district is now put under the  administration of Sibu Division.

Government
Sibu Rural District Council (SRDC) administers the Selangau town and district.

Geography

Selangau town is located at an intersection approximately 74 km from Sibu town, 84 km from Mukah town and 134 km from Bintulu town.

Climate
Selangau has a tropical rainforest climate (Af) with heavy to very heavy rainfall year-round.

Demographics
The population (2010) of the district is 24,412.

Economy
Selangau traders serve commuters along the Sibu-Bintulu trunk road on Pan Borneo Highway and workers from surrounding oil palm plantations with daily necessities.

Transport

Local Bus or Bus Express remain unclear

Selangau is the major stopover station for bus express. Selangau have accessibility of sea and land transportation via cars, trucks, bus and boats. Currently, it was accessed mainly on road as it used many times. Selangau included in Pan Borneo Highway project (WPC 08; Sg. Kua Bridge to Sg. Arip Bridge) and was managed by Lebuhraya Borneo Utara Sdn Bhd (LBU) as a turnkey contractor. The main purpose of this project is replacing the existing two-lane carriageway at the old road to new four-lane two-way carriageway, including a few new lanes and constructing of an interchange at Mukah junction and new bridges, including new Batang Mukah Bridge. The main contractor of this project is Musyati Mudajaya JV (MMJV) Sdn Bhd.

Other utilities

Education

Primary schools
SK Ulu Sungai Arip
SK Sungai Tau
SK Sungai Sepiring
SK Sungai Pakoh
SK Sungai Kemena
SK Sungai Buloh
SK Sungai Bawang
SK Sungai Arau
SK Sungai Anak
SK St Matthew Sekuau (M)
SK St Mark (M)
SK Penghulu Imban
SK Nanga Tajam
SK Nanga Selangau
SK Nanga Kua
SK Kuala Pelugau
SK Kuala Lemai
SK Iban Union
SK Bukit Arip
SK Batu 36
SK Dijih Selangau
SJK(C) Tong Ah

secondary schools
SMK Ulu Balingian

Healthcare
The town is served by a health clinic, Selangau Health Clinic operated by the Ministry of Health.

Fire station
The Selangau Fire Department Station was built, serving the emergency services, such as drowning and fire. It was managed by Fire and Rescue Department and Ministry of Housing and Local Government. With its existing, it will reducing response time from Sibu Fire Station and Mukah Fire Station.

Culture and leisure
There is a weekend bazaar at Selangau where natives could sell their jungle produce to their customers. Pesta Selangau (Selangau Festival) is held every year. Among the activities during the festival are: rafting, kayaking, and radio-controlled boat race.

References

External links
Laman Web Rasmi Pejabat Daerah Selangau

Selangau District
Towns in Sarawak